Tavistock College is a coeducational secondary school and sixth form located in Tavistock, Devon, England. There were (as of April 2020) approximately 1800 students attending. The schools draws students from a catchment area of about  radius.

The college has links with Japan, Uganda, Spain, Swaziland, Peru, France and India where staff exchanges and student visits and projects take place.

Success
In 2013, a Japanese teacher won the so-called "teachers' Oscar" for secondary school teacher of the year.

Ofsted Reviews
In early 2010, the school received a "notice to improve" from Ofsted, the national school inspection agency. After a failure to improve, the following year Tavistock College was placed under special measures. 
The school was placed into special measures in September 2011 and underwent a change in head teacher fairly soon after. The result of the changes made by school leadership led to an improvement in grades in the next years GCSEs. Following the success in 2012 and 2013, the school came out of special measures and has been progressing well.

History

Tavistock grammar school was founded in 1552. In the 1930s it stood "on the Plymouth road, a modern block with splendid playing fields" but was later moved to the current site to allow for expansion as Tavistock and surrounding areas grew in population.

The college motto was traditionally “Crescit sub pondere virtus” (Virtue flourishes under a burden); this is also the motto of the Earl of Denbigh. However, the school motto was changed to “Together: we care, we challenge, we excel”

Previously a community school administered by Devon County Council, in January 2018 Tavistock College converted to academy status. The school is now sponsored by the Dartmoor Multi-Academy Trust.

Curriculum
In 1996 Tavistock College began requiring year 7 and 8 students to take courses about the Japanese language, the first school in England to have such a requirement.

Other activities
Since 2006, the college has organised concerts locally under the name of ParkLife; a ParkLife festival was held in 2007 and 2008.

Tavistock College regularly takes students to remote regions of the world on expeditions with companies such as Camps International 

The college has also participated in fundraising activities and community tasks such as dog shows, the school sports day, local athletics competitions hosted on the extensive track and PE facilities.

Sports
Over £1.1m has been invested in new sporting facilities - an all-weather pitch, competition standard athletics track, and a football pitch development comprising seven pitches over the past years. The college Rugby and Football teams all extensively utilise these facilities as well as allowing local clubs such as Tavistock FC to train on the Astro on a regular basis. The track and other athletics facilities are regularly used for athletics clubs and for hosting competitions.

Most years the college engages in school “Sports Tours” with the Rugby, Football and netball teams to foreign destinations such as France, Italy or America where the teams compete over multiple tournaments during the trip.

Notable former pupils

 Trevor Colman politician, a Member of the European Parliament for South West England
 Graham Dawe, rugby union player
 Robert Hingley, pioneering ska musician
 Rosie Huntington-Whiteley, actress/model, came from a nearby farm; she is known for Transformers: Dark of the Moon
  Jack Derges, Actor, he is known for playing Andy Flynn in EastEnders
 Sam Lakeman, Seth Lakeman and Sean Lakeman, folk musicians
 Greg Parker, Professor of Photonics at Southampton University

References

External links
 Official website
 Ofsted report on Tavistock College
 "Tavistock College aims for swift improvements and rising standards" Press Release from Devon County Council, 26 March 2010

Secondary schools in Devon
Academies in Devon
Tavistock